Geraldina "Dina" Rachel Asher-Smith,  (born 4 December 1995) is a British sprinter. She is the fastest British woman on record. She won a gold medal in the 200 metres, silver in the 100 metres and another silver in the 4×100 m relay at the 2019 World Championships, breaking her own British records with further records which still stand. Aged 24, Asher-Smith was the first Briton to win three medals at a World Championships. She earned a bronze in the 200 m at the 2022 World Championships. As part of 4×100 m relay teams, she won medals at the 2016 Rio Olympics and 2020 Tokyo Olympics, and also at the 2013 and 2017 World Championships.

Asher-Smith won the 2013 European Junior 200 m title and the 2014 World Junior 100 m title. In July 2015, she became the first British woman to run under 11 seconds for the 100 m. She then broke Kathy Cook's 31-year-old British 200 m record when finishing fifth at the 2015 World Championships. In this distance, she placed fifth at the 2016 Olympics and fourth at the 2017 World Championships. Asher-Smith is also a three-time individual European champion, including the 200 m title in 2016 and the 100 m/200 m double in 2018, and earned a silver for the 200 m in 2022. She was 100 m 2019 Diamond League champion.

She is the British record holder for the 100 m and 200 m and the British indoor record holder for the 60 m. Asher-Smith has been listed in the Powerlist as one of the UK's most influential people of African-Caribbean descent, most recently in the 2021 edition.

Early life and education
Dina Asher-Smith was born on 4 December 1995 in Orpington, London. Her parents are Julie, who was born in London, and Winston, who was born in Jamaica but moved to England when he was a child. She has Jamaican and Trinidadian ancestry. She attended Perry Hall Primary School. From 2008 to 2014, she attended Newstead Wood School in Orpington. Asher-Smith achieved 9 A stars in her GCSEs. In August 2014, she got 3 As for her A-Level exam results which allowed her entry into King's College London to study history. Upon receiving the results, she called it "the best morning" of her life. Asher-Smith graduated with a 1st class BA in 2017. She is a supporter of Manchester United F.C.

Asher-Smith is coached by John Blackie. In 2009, she ran the 300 metres in 39.16 seconds to set the current world age 13 best. She has won the English Schools Championships 200 m title as an Under 15 (2010), U17 (2011) and U20 (2013). She won the 2013 event in a time of 23.63 s into a strong headwind.

Asher-Smith worked as a kit-bag carrier during the 2012 London Olympics, including on "Super Saturday".

Junior competitions

At the 2012 World Junior Championships, Asher-Smith finished seventh in the 200 m final in a then personal best time of 23.50 seconds. She said afterwards that "I am elated to have made the final and achieve a PB in the process, and I'm looking ahead to next year in Italy."

In 2013, she earned two gold medals at the European Junior Championships in Rieti, winning the 200 m in 23.29 s, before joining Yasmin Miller, Steffi Wilson and Desiree Henry to win the 4 × 100 m relay and break the UK junior record. The British squad originally finished fourth in the final but were promoted to the bronze medal after the disqualification of the French team. Asher-Smith was shortlisted for the 2013 BBC Young Sports Personality of the Year.

At the 2014 World Junior Championships in Eugene, Asher-Smith won the 100 metres running 11.23 seconds.

Professional athletics career
Asher-Smith was part of the winning Great Britain team for the 4 × 100 m relay at the London Grand Prix meet and was the youngest athlete selected for the Great Britain and Northern Ireland Squad for the 2013 World Championships in Moscow. Along with teammates Annabelle Lewis, Ashleigh Nelson and Hayley Jones, she won a bronze medal in the 4 × 100 m relay.

At the 2014 European Athletics Championships in Zurich, she qualified for the 200 m final but pulled out with a hamstring injury on the bend.

She took the silver medal for the 60 m at the 2015 European Indoor Championships. It was the first time in 30 years that a British female won a medal in the event. In doing so, Asher-Smith equalled Jeanette Kwakye's British record of 7.08 s and, being 19 years old, became the fastest ever teenager at 60 m. She first broke the British 100 metres record with 11.02 s on 24 May in Hengelo, before becoming the first British woman to run a legal time under 11 seconds, with 10.99 s on 25 July at the London Anniversary Games. She then finished fifth at the 2015 IAAF World Championships in Beijing with a time of 22.07 s, a new British record.

At the 2016 Summer Olympics in Rio de Janeiro, Asher-Smith finished fifth in the 200 metres, in 22.31 seconds, then won a bronze medal with her teammates Asha Philip, Desiree Henry and Daryll Neita in the 4 x 100 m relay in a British record of 41.77 seconds.

On 17 February 2017, Asher-Smith broke her foot in a training accident, but still managed to secure fourth place in the women's 200 m and a silver medal as part of the Great Britain 4 × 100 m relay later that year at the IAAF World Championships in London.

In 2018, she went to Australia early to train and get used to the conditions prior to the Commonwealth Games scheduled to take place in Gold Coast, Queensland in that country. She qualified for the final, and came away with a Commonwealth bronze medal with a time off 22.29 seconds. England ladies, including Asher-Smith, qualified for the 4x100 m relay final, where they won gold in a time of 42.46 seconds, beating one of the favorites, Jamaica. At the 2018 European Championships in Berlin, Asher-Smith won both the 100 m and 200m metres titles, improving her British records to 10.85 and 21.89 seconds respectively, becoming the first British woman in history to run below 22 seconds for 200 metres, and moving to 22nd on the 200 metres world all-time list (35th at 100 m). She won a third gold medal in the 4 × 100 m relay. Asher-Smith was named women's European Athlete of the Year for her success in October. She was later hailed by IAAF president Sebastian Coe as the next sprint sensation in athletics.

Asher-Smith won the silver medal in the 100 m at the 2019 IAAF World Championships in a new British record of 10.83 seconds, finishing second behind only Shelly-Ann Fraser-Pryce. She was the first female British sprinter to win, over 100 m or 200 m, an individual medal in the world championships since Kathy Cook in 1983. On 2 October, she became the World Champion in the 200 m, setting a personal best and new British record of 21.88 seconds.

Going into the 2021 season, Asher-Smith was a strong medal favourite for the short sprints at the 2020 Summer Olympics in Tokyo. Her season was off to a promising start in May when she won the women's 100 m final at the Gateshead Diamond League against a world class field, besting athletes such as Shelly-Ann Fraser-Pryce, Blessing Okagbare, Marie-Josée Ta Lou and Sha'Carri Richardson. She followed this up in late June when she won the 100 m final at the 2021 British Athletics Championships in a time of 10.97 seconds. The clock had originally reported 10.71 seconds, which would have been a substantial national record, however this was corrected a few minutes later. She came into the Olympics having gained selection in the 100 m, 200 m and 4 x 100 m relay, however failed to qualify for the 100 m final after placing third in her semifinal in a time of 11.05 seconds, which was not enough to gain a fastest non-automatic qualifying spot. Subsequently, she revealed in an emotional interview that she had actually sustained a hamstring injury during the finals of the British championships, and that she would be pulling out of the 200 m. Nevertheless, she managed to return to contribute to the 4 x 100 m relay, aiding Great Britain in setting a new national record of 41.55 seconds in their heat, followed by a bronze medal in the final behind Jamaica and the United States. She later bounced back to end her 2021 campaign with season's bests of 10.87 seconds and 22.04 seconds towards the end of the Diamond League circuit, the 200 m in Brussels and 100 m at the final in Zurich.

Other activities
Asher-Smith has modelled for Louis Vuitton, Valentino and Off-White, and in 2019 had a Barbie created in her likeness. The same year, she made a cameo appearance in the music video for the single "Black" by Dave.

In 2021, she was awarded an honorary doctorate from the University of Kent.

Major competitive record

Personal bests

International competition

Circuit wins and titles
 Diamond League champion 100 m: 2019 
 2016 (1): Stockholm Bauhaus-Galan (200m)
 2018 (1): Stockholm (100m)
 2019 (3): Brussels Memorial Van Damme (100m), Doha Diamond League (200m), Stockholm (200m)
 2021 (2): Gateshead British Grand Prix (100m), Rome Golden Gala in Florence (200m)
 2022 (3): Birmingham Diamond League (100m & 4x100m relay), Stockholm (200m)
 World Indoor Tour
 2023: Karlsruhe Init Indoor Meeting (WL =MR )

National titles
 British Athletics Championships
 100 m: (4) 2015, 2018, 2019, 2021
 200 m: (1) 2016
 British Indoor Athletics Championships
 60 m: (1) 2015
 200 m: (1) 2014

See also
 100 metres
 100 metres at the World Athletics Championships
 200 metres
 200 metres at the World Athletics Championships
 List of World Championships in Athletics medalists (women) 
 2018 in 100 metres
 2020/21 in 60 metres

Notes

References

External links

 
 

1995 births
Living people
People from Orpington
Athletes from London
British female sprinters
Olympic athletes of Great Britain
Olympic bronze medallists for Great Britain
Olympic bronze medalists in athletics (track and field)
Athletes (track and field) at the 2016 Summer Olympics
Medalists at the 2016 Summer Olympics
Commonwealth Games gold medallists for England
Commonwealth Games bronze medallists for England
Commonwealth Games gold medallists in athletics
Commonwealth Games medallists in athletics
Athletes (track and field) at the 2018 Commonwealth Games
World Athletics Championships athletes for Great Britain
World Athletics Championships winners
European Athletics Championships winners
World Athletics U20 Championships winners
British Athletics Championships winners
Diamond League winners
European Athlete of the Year winners
The Sunday Times Sportswoman of the Year winners
BBC 100 Women
Alumni of King's College London
Fellows of King's College London
People associated with the University of Kent
English sportspeople of Jamaican descent
English sportspeople of Trinidad and Tobago descent
People educated at Newstead Wood School
Black British sportswomen
Athletes (track and field) at the 2020 Summer Olympics
Medalists at the 2020 Summer Olympics
Olympic female sprinters
Medallists at the 2018 Commonwealth Games